Weferlingen is a village and a former municipality in the Börde district in Saxony-Anhalt, Germany. Since 1 January 2010, it has been part of the town of Oebisfelde-Weferlingen.

Weferlingen was featured in the Global Mobilization Creator DLC for Bohemia Interactive's ArmA 3.

People from Weferlingen
 :de:Rüdiger Barton (1954- ), Keyboard player and composer in the German Rockband Silly
 Angela Voigt (1951–2013), track and field athlete and Olympic champion
 Max Peiffer Watenphul (1896-1976), Painter and former Bauhaus student
 Reinhold von Werner (1825–1909), Vice-admiral and writer of Naval history

Former municipalities in Saxony-Anhalt
Oebisfelde-Weferlingen